Nicolas Saudray (born 1942) is a French novelist. Born in Normandy, he worked in the French civil service as an economist. He was also an administrator of the Bibliothèque nationale de France.

He is best known for his novel La maison des prophètes which won the Prix Méditerranée as well as the Prix Lange from the Académie française. It was translated into English under the title The House of the Prophets.

References

1942 births
Writers from Normandy
20th-century French novelists
21st-century French novelists
French economists
Living people
French male novelists
20th-century French male writers
21st-century French male writers
French male non-fiction writers